Michael Kinsey Joy (born November 25, 1949) is an American TV sports announcer, businessman, and former politician who currently serves as the lap-by-lap voice of Fox Sports' coverage of NASCAR. His color analyst is Clint Bowyer. Counting 2023, Joy has been part of the live broadcast of 44 Daytona 500s (7 for MRN Radio, 17 for CBS and 20 for FOX). He also serves as expert analyst for A&E Networks History Channel and FYI live TV coverage of collector car auctions.

Biography

Early life and career
Joy was born November 25, 1949 in Chicago, Illinois to M. Verne Joy and Jean Peters Joy, the oldest of their four children. He was raised in Windsor, Connecticut, and graduated from West Hartford, Connecticut's Conard High School. His career began as a public address announcer at Riverside Park Speedway in Agawam, Mass. in 1970 while attending the University of Hartford and later Emerson College.

He added Thompson Speedway in 1972 and in 1975 began working at Stafford Motor Speedway in Connecticut, joining Jack Arute, Jr., the son of the track owner, establishing the track as a hotbed for announcers. Announcing five nights per week, he was noticed by Motor Racing Network (MRN) co-founder Ken Squier. MRN hired him as a freelancer in 1975, then full-time in late 1978, working weekdays in marketing for Daytona International Speedway. He rose to co-anchor, general manager and executive producer of MRN in January 1980. In 1981, he was the lead broadcaster for ESPN's first live NASCAR telecast in that November's Atlanta Journal 500 at Atlanta International Raceway.

CBS Sports and The Nashville Network (1983–2000)
In June 1983, Joy became a pit reporter for CBS' coverage, working with Ken Squier and Ned Jarrett. Since CBS didn't broadcast many races, he also continued to broadcast for MRN radio.

Joy also launched The Nashville Network's NASCAR coverage in 1991, as lap-by-lap announcer, continuing through 1995, and also participated in live NASCAR coverage on TBS.  When NASCAR went to Indy, Joy anchored the IMS Radio Network live coverage from the first Brickyard 400 in 1994 through 1998.

Joy was one of the first announcers to embrace the Internet. In 1997, he encouraged Usenet and Jayski readers to e-mail TV coverage suggestions that he could present in a CBS seminar. A member of many Usenet newsgroups, he read them for preparation for broadcasts.

In 1998, after 15 years on pit road, CBS Sports made Joy their lap-by-lap announcer with Ken Squier becoming the studio host, where the pair worked until the end of 2000, when CBS lost the rights to televise NASCAR racing.

Joy's CBS career included most major forms of American motorsports for television: Formula One, CART, IRL, and drag racing, as well as coverage of college football, the Winter Olympics, the Sun Bowl, harness racing's Hambletonian, Pro Beach Volleyball and World Cup Skiing, plus NCAA championship events in soccer, gymnastics, swimming and diving, track and field, lacrosse, and wrestling.

Fox Sports (1998–present)
Joy joined Fox Sports in 1998 to become the lead announcer of Formula One coverage on Fox Sports Net, with Derek Bell as expert analyst.

For the 2001 season, he moved full-time to Fox with the NASCAR TV package. Joy teamed with Hall of Fame driver Darrell Waltrip and former crew chief Larry McReynolds to form the network's broadcast team. The 2022 Daytona 500 was his 22nd as lead TV race announcer, and the 46th Daytona Speedweeks in which he has been part of live broadcast coverage.

Joy, Waltrip, and McReynolds completed 15 years together in 2015, the longest tenure of any three-man announcing booth in US network sports television history. Four-time NASCAR champion Jeff Gordon joined Joy and Waltrip in the FOX-TV booth beginning 2016, with McReynolds moving to a new role as race strategist and rules analyst. Waltrip retired after 2019. FOX added NASCAR Cup driver Clint Bowyer to the booth in 2021. At season's end, Gordon returned to Hendrick Motorsports full-time as vice-chairman. For 2022, Joy and Bowyer were joined by a different guest analyst each week, including Tony Stewart, Richard Petty, and Dale Earnhardt Jr.

Fox broadcasts the Daytona 500 and the first 16 NASCAR Cup races each season, plus two all-star events. Joy also anchors NASCAR Cup coverage on Fox-owned cable network Fox Sports 1 (FS1), formerly Speed.

Four weeks every year, Joy brings his extensive knowledge of collector cars to the Barrett-Jackson auction block as lead analyst for the live TV auction coverage. His unscripted commentary mixes detailed knowledge of the cars and their specs with first-hand recall of how cars of the 1950s to 1970s were viewed back in their day. When the TV rights moved to Velocity/Discovery beginning in 2015, Joy was the first talent Discovery hired to lead their broadcast team in the same role on loan from Fox. Beginning in 2020, the Barrett-Jackson TV rights moved to A&E Networks, with Joy continuing in the lead expert role.

In September 2008, Fox sent Joy to call a Minnesota Twins/Tampa Bay Rays Major League Baseball game, in which the Rays clinched their first-ever playoff appearance.

Joy is very active on social media; his Twitter handle is @mikejoy500. He engages in many automotive web forums, from El Caminos to MGs to Ford GTs, usually using the screen name "200mph".

Honors
Joy is a charter member of the prestigious NASCAR Hall of Fame Voting Panel, and in December 2013, was named sole media representative to the Hall's exclusive nominating process.

In 2000, Joy was inducted into the Riverside Park Speedway Hall of Fame.

In March 2014, a Sporting News poll named Joy first among network television's 15 NASCAR announcers and analysts with a 93% approval rating.

Joy was voted the 2011 recipient of the Henry T. McLemore Award, (now the "American Motorsports Media Award of Excellence"). Presented since 1969, this award celebrates career excellence in motorsports journalism and is voted on solely by past winners. The Motorsports Hall of Fame at Daytona International Speedway displays a wall of plaques honoring the winners, with smaller displays in several track media centers.

In 2019, he was named to the voting panel for the Indianapolis Motor Speedway Hall of Fame, and on November 10 of that year, he was inducted in the New England Auto Racers Hall of Fame.

He is a member, and past vice-president, of the National Motorsports Press Association.

In January 2023, Joy was inducted in the Eastern Motorsports Press Association Hall of Fame

Notable calls
February 15, 1998  – Joy was the lap-by-lap announcer for CBS Sports' coverage of the Daytona 500, where he called Dale Earnhardt's win after his 20th attempt to win the Great American Race.

"20 years of trying, 20 years of frustration. Dale Earnhardt will come to the caution flag to win the Daytona 500! Finally, the most anticipated moment in racing! If John Elway can win the Super Bowl, Dale Earnhardt said he can win the Daytona 500, and if he comes around under caution to complete this final lap, the taste of long awaited victory will be his. Checkered flag! Dale Earnhardt finally is a champion of the Daytona 500!"

March 16, 2003 – Joy was the lap-by-lap announcer for Fox's coverage of the 2003 Carolina Dodge Dealers 400, where Ricky Craven edged out Kurt Busch in the closest finish in NASCAR history at 0.002 seconds.

Analyst Darrell Waltrip: Watch this! Here he [Craven] goes! Craven gets [up] that high right next to that wall watch! 
Analyst Larry McReynolds: Right there! Right in the middle! 
Waltrip: [Craven] Cuts down! He is gonna make it dow– Is he gonna get down under him?! That's not the way to do it I don't know! Come on baby! Come on! 
McReynolds Side by side, 2 laps to go! Someone's gotta give getting into turn 1! 
Joy: Nobody! Into the wall goes Busch! 
Waltrip: That's not– That was not a very good idea! 
McReynolds [Busch] Put the crossover move he got into him! 
Joy: And here comes [Dave] Blaney! Blaney is now the best car on the track! 
Waltrip: Oh ho! Oh! Oh baby! I'm telling you Kurt Busch is not gonna give up the win! 
McReynolds: No he's not! They'll be coming to the white flag this time Ricky Craven is not gonna give up either! 
Waltrip: Come on Ricky! 
McReynolds: He gets that run on the high side right there Kurt Busch has already used up everything with his race car! 
Waltrip: Come on baby! Here he comes! Here we go again! He's going to wait on this! He's going to put the crossover on him! He realized that was not a good move that last time! 
Joy: White flag! 
Waltrip: Here he goes! He's gonna try to slide under him here come on baby! 
Joy: And Blaney's coming! 
McReynolds: Both these cars are driving terrible right now! Half a lap to go! 
Waltrip: Nah! Nah, they're driving good! Come on baby you can do it at this end of the speedway come off of 4, and get up alongside of him! 
Joy: Half a mile to go! (Craven looks to the inside of Busch) 
Waltrip (over Joy): Here he comes! Here he comes! 
McReynolds: Who gets off the corner better?! 
Waltrip (over McReynolds): Here he comes! Here he comes he's got him this time! 
McReynolds: It's going to be a drag race! (Both cars turn into each other) 
Joy and Waltrip: WOW! 
McReynolds: THEY TOUCH! THEY TOUCH! (cars cross the finish line) 
Joy: CRAVEN! 
McReyonalds: OH WOW! 
Waltrip: CRAVEN! HE GOT HIM! 
Waltrip: CRAVEN GOT HIM! 
McReynalds: CRAVEN GOT HIM! 
Joy: And– 
Waltrip (interrupts Joy): CRAVEN! ALRIGHT! WHAT A FINISH! 
Joy: HAVE YOU EVER?! 
Waltrip: NO I'VE NEVER! 
Joy: WOW! 

February 18, 2007 – Joy was the lap-by-lap announcer for Fox's coverage of the 2007 Daytona 500, where Kevin Harvick made a last lap pass on Mark Martin to win by 0.02 seconds in a photo finish. Joy's call of the final lap:

Joy: White flag, one lap to go! 
Analyst Larry McReynolds: Front four [cars], single file. 
Analyst Darrell Waltrip: Here they come, they got to go – they got to get Mark [Martin] moved. They got to move him somehow. 
McReynolds: He gets back to that yellow line right around the bottom, all the way through turns 1 and 2. 
Waltrip: Mark Martin is driving the race of his life. And there's nobody that's better at holding people off at Daytona. 
Joy: Kyle Busch lying back a little bit. Is he gonna get help? Is he gonna come? Is he looking? Almost- he almost squeezed Harvick into the wall, and here comes Harvick, the 29 [car] with Matt Kenseth! 
Waltrip: Oh, Mark got loose. Mark got loose. 
McReynolds: And Harvick's getting a run off turn 4! It's gonna be a drag race all the way back to the start-finish line! (Kyle Busch spins off turn 4, causing multi-car wreck) No caution! They're side by side right to the line! 
Joy: Big crash, here they come. Checkered flag. HARVICK! 
McReynolds and Waltrip (over Joy): HARVICK!  
Joy: Kevin Harvick wins the Daytona 500! 
McReynolds: We got one car on his ROOF coming across the start-finish line, [that's] Clint Bowyer! 
Waltrip (over McReynolds): They're still wrecking. They're still wrecking. They're wrecking everywhere. Bowyer's on fire. Jeff Gordon's wrecked.   McReynolds: And they are still wrecking. 
Joy: Montoya, Stremme, Kenseth, Biffle, Marlin, Carl Edwards, Casey Mears all crashed on the final lap. **pauses** Have you ever?! 
Waltrip: Well, a couple of times. 
McReynolds: I'ma repeat what I heard a few years ago, no I have never! 

September 20, 2008  – Joy was the play-by-play announcer for Fox Sports's coverage of the game between the Minnesota Twins and the Tampa Bay Rays, where the Rays clinched the team's first playoff berth in franchise history. Joy's call of the final out:

"Fly ball, left field... CAUGHT! Bottom fishers no more! The Rays are going to the playoffs!"  

February 20, 2011 – Joy was the lap-by-lap announcer for Fox's coverage of the 2011 Daytona 500, where Trevor Bayne pulled off an upset to score his first and only Cup victory of his career in his second Cup Series start.

Joy: They'll face the white flag when they come around to decide the 53rd Daytona 500! Rookie Trevor Bayne in his second Sprint Cup start will lead them to the white flag with Bobby Labonte! Here comes Kurt Busch and Juan [Pablo] Montoya, Carl Edwards in 5th! 
McReynolds: And we know that Kurt Busch and Montoya is going to make a move, DW when will they make it?! 
Waltrip: I don't think they're gonna make it until turn 4 I mean we keep hearing about I'm a sitting duck when I'm leading this thing so  I guess that's what makes the 21 [car] a sitting duck right now but... we'll see here that 22 [car] knows how to win from that position that's where he won the Bud Shootout from!  
Joy: Edwards and Gilliland down to the inside trying to– 
Waltrip (interrupts Joy): WHERE DID THAT 34 [car] COME FROM?! 
McReynolds: That's David Gilliland! 
Joy: [Edwards and Gilliland] trying to spoil the party! 
Waltrip: Oh my gosh! 
McReynolds (over Waltrip): And he spoiled the party for Kurt Busch and Montoya and here they come through turn 4! 
Joy: Gilliand, former pole-sitter of the 500! Edwards has room underneath! And now he pushes Trevor Bayne! 
Waltrip: IT'S OVER! 
Joy: CINDERELLA STORY! 
Waltrip: BAYNE IS GOING TO WIN THE DAYTONA 500! 
McReynalds: HE DID IT! 
Joy: BAYNE WINS IT! UNBELIEVEABLE! 
Waltrip: HAPPY BIRTHDAY TREVOR BAYNE 20 YEARS OLD! AHHH HA HAAA! 

April 17, 2011 – Joy was the lap-by-lap announcer for Fox's coverage of the 2011 Aaron's 499, where Jimmie Johnson beat Clint Bowyer and Jeff Gordon in a three-wide finish and in a tie for the closest finish in NASCAR Cup Series history at 0.002 seconds.

Joy: But they (Clint Bowyer and Kevin Harvick) can't clear the Fords (Carl Edwards and Greg Biffle) and protect the bottom because Edwards comes storming back on the inside! 
Waltrip: Well, what else it does it opens the door for these two cats (Jeff Gordon and Mark Martin) right here who have timed it out pretty darn good coming to the white flag! 
McReynolds: And here comes their teammates as well, Johnson and Earnhardt Jr.! White flag this time! 
Waltrip: Those have been the two best cars right [for] most of this race they're just now showing it! 
Joy: The last lap has waived as they started up front and leads it [for] Jeff Gordon! 
Waltrip: But here comes the next two pair (Bowyer and Harvick) that these two cats right here may have timed it out too! Lets see what happens down the back! 
Joy: Now they will get a draft off Mark Martin! And here's the slingshot to the outside! 
Waltrip: 'Stay together' that's what their saying 'stay together! Push push push!' It's going to get tight down here in turn three! 
Joy: And don't forget Jimmie Johnson and Dale Jr. fifth and sixth they are there! Which group will they go with and will it help any of those cars or will it help to get Jeff Gordon to victory lane?! 
Waltrip (over Joy): Here they come! 
McReynolds: All bets are off [as] they get to the middle of the tri-oval! (Johnson and Earnhardt Jr. look inside) 
Waltrip: Watch out down low! They got a run! 
Joy (over Waltrip): Way down comes Johnson! 
Waltrip: Good run boys! 
Joy: HE'S GOT ROOM! THEY'RE THREE-WIDE! THREE BY THREE TO THE LINE! (cars cross the finish line) 
Waltrip: JOHNSON! 
Joy: MAYBE JIMMIE JOHNSON! 
Waltrip: I believe he got him by an inch! 
McReynolds: TWO ONE THOUSANDS OF A SECOND! HE BEAT BOWYER! 
Waltrip: Okay a sixteenth of an inch! 
Joy: Have you ever?! 
Waltrip: Oh man! 
Joy: Ha ha ha ha ha ha ha. 
Waltrip: Oh man! 
McReyonlds: No we have never! 
Waltrip: I have never seen anything like that! 

May 5, 2013  – Joy was the lap-by-lap announcer for Fox's coverage of the Aaron's 499, where David Ragan pulled off to win on a last lap pass. Joy's call of the final lap:

Joy: (Jimmie) Johnson looked high, (Matt) Kenseth to draft with Edwards. Johnson to the bottom, (Aric) Almirola to the top!
Waltrip: Man, Matt got shuffled out again!
Joy: Jimmie Johnson with Carl Edwards, but Kenseth up the middle coming back! Help from David Ragan! Up to the bumper of Carl Edwards! Ragan in the middle, his teammate (David) Gilliland is the pusher. They're right on the bumper of Edwards... is there anywhere to go? Ragan to the bottom, Gilliland with him!
Waltrip (over Joy): Look at Ragan!
Joy: David Ragan, July winner at Daytona couple of years ago, Gilliland with him! Edwards up top! Michael Waltrip to help, and here they come off turn 4!
Waltrip: Push boys, push! Push hard!
Joy: Edwards high, Ragan comes up, covers the spot.
Waltrip (over Joy): Gilliland! Gilliland has got him! He's got him!
Joy: Ragan and Gilliland! Front Row Racing is going to victory lane at Talladega! Ragan first, Gilliland second! How about that!

June 26, 2016 – Joy was the lap-by-lap announcer for Fox's coverage of the 2016 Toyota/Save Mart 350, where Tony Stewart won his final career race in a tight last lap against Denny Hamlin.

Joy: And the white flag waves! One [lap] to go sponsored by Credit One Bank. 
Analyst Jeff Gordon: Well this is the closest Hamlin's been in a few laps. 
Waltrip: I tell you I think Hamlin's going to– He's going to pounce if he's got anything! Tony better not do what he did into [turn] seven this time or he's in trouble. **pauses** He's working him. 
Joy: Not close enough. 
Waltrip: Nope. Tony is right where he needs to be man. 
Gordon: Let's see if he can make a gain. It's all about getting off this corner. He gets in there good. Oh! He missed a little bit. He is trying to make a run. (Hamlin looks inside of Tony) Uh oh. Oh! He wheel hopped and he's gonna get there! 
Waltrip: Hamlin is there! 
Gordon: He hit him! (Hamlin passes Stewart) 
Waltrip: Ahh he got him! 
Joy: Oh no! 
Waltrip: Oh no! No! 
Joy: It's not over! 
Gordon: Denny got in there and wheel hopped. I don't think he meant for that to happen but Denny made contact with Tony. I think Tony was also loose getting in there. 
Waltrip: Well that is what happened to Tony the lap before you know when he got loose getting into seven and that allowed Hamlin to close up. 
Gordon: Hey, this thing's not over guys! Watch what happens into turn 11 in this heavy braking zone! 
Joy: Two more corners! Hamlin trying to pull away! 
Gordon: Let's see if he's close enough! 
Waltrip: I think Tony used up his stuff. I mean we knew he was having issues with the car. 
Joy: Here we go! (Stewart looks to the inside of Hamlin) 
Gordon: Oh! Oh! Oh! Look at this! Oh! 
Joy: Stewart inside! HE IS THERE! HE GETS HAMLIN! THEY HIT! (Stewart passes Hamlin) 
Gordon: WOAH! 
Joy: AND STEWART COMES OFF TURN 11! 
Waltrip: LOOK AT THIS! WOOOOO HO HO HO! 
Joy: AND HE'S COMING TO THE FLAG! TONY STEWART WINS! 
Gordon: HOW DID HE DO THAT?! 
Waltrip: HOW DID THAT HAPPEN?! ARE YOU KIDDING ME?! HA HA HAAA! 
Gordon: Oh my goodness!

Terminology

Silly Season: Joy brought the term to NASCAR during his MRN radio days.  "Henry N. Manney used the term frequently in Road & Track to describe the early fall, when there is rampant rumor and speculation about driver/team pairings for the following Formula 1 season. I borrowed it for our broadcasts," Joy said. As the radio feed was carried in each track's press box, writers quickly adopted the term.

Vortex Theory: Joy's unproven theory whereby a large group of high-powered race cars circulating an oval track create a rising column of hot air, which repels rain-producing cloud formations. Though debunked repeatedly by meteorologists and scientists, anecdotal evidence abounds where rain would begin just after a race ended or was slowed by a caution flag. Joy first promoted this "theory" on race telecasts in the 1990s.  When he aired it on FOX in 2001, broadcast partner Darrell Waltrip championed its cause.  Waltrip popularized Vortex Theory on air to the extent that many drivers and fans think DW invented it.  Though still scientifically unproven, evidence to support it continues to build.

Personal life

Joy resides near Winston-Salem, North Carolina with his wife Gaye. They have a son and daughter in college. He restores vintage MGs, and retains his New England roots as CEO and equity partner in New England Racing Fuel Inc., distributor of Sunoco Race Fuels.

Joy is an accomplished sports car racer, winning races at Lime Rock, Pocono, Watkins Glen, and New Hampshire, and has competed in the Rolex 24 at Daytona, America's premier endurance race. Joy is well known as TV host of the Rolex Monterey Motorsports Reunion. In August 2012, his drive in Historic Trans-Am at Laguna Seca was awarded the Bonham's Cup, and in September 2013, he won an Historic Trans-Am race at Lime Rock.
 
He previously developed special events advertising for GM's Pontiac Motor Division, including auto racing and a Hall & Oates rock tour, and managed and promoted a major auto racing facility, Lime Rock Park.

Joy was elected to four two-year terms on the Windsor, Connecticut town council, where his committee was responsible for health, public safety and environmental issues for Windsor's 28,000 residents.

References

1949 births
American television reporters and correspondents
Emerson College alumni
Living people
University of Hartford alumni
Motorsport announcers
People from Chicago
Olympic Games broadcasters
College basketball announcers in the United States
College football announcers
Major League Baseball broadcasters
IMSA GT Championship drivers
24 Hours of Daytona drivers
Sportspeople from Hartford, Connecticut
NASCAR people
Racing drivers from Connecticut
American radio sports announcers
American television sports announcers
Connecticut city council members